This is a list of Native American place names in the U.S. state of Maryland.

 Accokeek, Maryland
 Anacostia River
 Aquasco, Maryland
 Catoctin Mountain
 Chaptico, Maryland
 Chesapeake Bay
 Choptank River
 Choptank, Maryland
 Conewago Creek (west)
 Conococheague Creek
 Conowingo Creek
 Conowingo, Maryland
 Honga River
 Indian Creek Village, Maryland
 Indian Head, Maryland
 Indian Springs, Maryland
 Lake Kittamaqundi
 Little Choptank River
 Little Conococheague Creek
 Little Monocacy River
 Matapeake, Maryland
 Mattawoman Creek
 Monocacy River
 Nanjemoy Creek
 Nanjemoy, Maryland
 Nanticoke River
 Nanticoke River Wildlife Management Area
 Nanticoke, Maryland
 Nassawango Creek
 Oppoquimimi River
 Patapsco River
 Patuxent River
 Piscataway Creek
 Piscataway Park
 Piscataway, Maryland
 Pocomoke City, Maryland
 Pocomoke River
 Pocomoke Sound
 Pomonkey Creek
 Pomonkey, Maryland
 Quantico, Maryland
 Susquehanna River
 Tuscarora Creek (Monocacy River)
 Tuscarora Creek (Potomac River)
 Tuscarora, Maryland
 Wicomico County, Maryland
 Wicomico River (Maryland eastern shore)
 Wicomico River (Potomac River)
 Youghiogheny River

 
Native American origin in Maryland
Native American-related lists
Maryland-related lists
Native American history of Maryland